Adam Pecorari (born November 28, 1984 in Aston, Pennsylvania) is a former racing driver. Pecorari won races in the USF2000 and later competed in the Atlantic Championship, IMSA Lites and other series.

Racing career
Pecorari was a successful kart racer with the World Karting Association and the International Kart Federation. Pecorari won his first IKF Grand National Championship in 1996. The young driver scored two second places in the WKA championship in 1999 and 2001. Pecorari also competed in the Formula A class at the Junior Monaco Kart Cup.

For 2003 Pecorari joined Andersen Walko Racing in the USF2000 Ford Zetec championship. He scored one podium finish, at Mid-Ohio Sports Car Course, and finished seventh in the championship standings. Pecorari improved for 2004. The Pennsylvania native won four races, three at Mid-Ohio and another at Road America. He finished third in the championship, behind teammate Andrew Prendeville. Pecorari also made two starts in the Atlantic Championship with Jensen Motorsport. His best result was a ninth place Circuit Gilles Villeneuve. Pecorari returned in the Atlantic Championship for one race in 2005, he retired with technical difficulties.

For 2006 Pecorari joined Cape Motorsports in the IMSA Lites L1 class. At Road Atlanta Pecorari won the inaugural event of the series beating John Bender and Duncan Ende. Pecorari went on to win the championship in dominant fashion, winning nine out of ten races. His success in the IMSA Lites prototype class landed him a seat in the American Le Mans Series with Van der Steur Racing in the LMP2 class. Pecorari made his debut for the team at the 2006 Monterey Sports Car Championships. The team, with Pecorari, Gunnar van der Steur and Ben Devlin failed to finish the race. Pecorari returned for the 2007 Northeast Grand Prix. The young driver finished the Radical SR9 in tenth place overall, seventh in class. This was the best result for Pecorari at Van der Steur Racing. At the 2009 Northeast Grand Prix Pecorari and Van der Steur finished fifteenth overall, but third in class.

Complete motorsports results

American Open-Wheel racing results
(key) (Races in bold indicate pole position, races in italics indicate fastest race lap)

Complete USF2000 National Championship results

Atlantic Championship

Star Mazda Championship

References

1984 births
Racing drivers from Pennsylvania
World Karting Association drivers
International Kart Federation drivers
U.S. F2000 National Championship drivers
Indy Pro 2000 Championship drivers
Atlantic Championship drivers
American Le Mans Series drivers
Rolex Sports Car Series drivers
24 Hours of Daytona drivers
Living people